Chinese tea culture (simplified Chinese: 中国茶文化; traditional Chinese: 中國茶文化) (zhōngguó chá wénhuà, 'Chinese tea culture') includes all facets of tea, both physical and spiritual, that significantly influenced Chinese culture throughout history. Physically, it consists of the history of tea cultivation, brewing, serving techniques, methods of consumption, arts, and the tea ceremony. Tea culture is to take tea as a carrier, and through this carrier to spread various arts. Tea culture is an integral part of the excellent traditional Chinese culture, and its content is very rich. Tea culture is the organic fusion of tea and culture, which contains and embodies the manifestation of a certain period of material and spiritual civilization. Tea culture is the combination of tea art and spirit, and the expression of tea art through Spirituality. It emerged in China in the Tang Dynasty, flourished in the Song and Ming Dynasties, and declined in the Qing Dynasty.

Tea culture in China was the source of influence on tea cultures in neighboring East Asian countries such as Japan and Korea since the ancient and medieval times, with each country developing a slightly different form of tea ceremony throughout the history; nevertheless, this difference is small when compared to countries that were late adopters to tea, such as the United Kingdom, United States, and Russia, who have developed vastly divergent tea cultures from China, especially in  terms of preparation, taste, and occasion when it is consumed. Tea is still consumed regularly, both on casual and formal occasions in modern China. In addition to being a popular beverage, it is used as an integral ingredient in traditional Chinese medicine as well as in Chinese cuisine.

Etymology

The concept of tea culture is referred to in Chinese as chayi ("the art of drinking tea"), or cha wenhua ("tea culture"). The word cha (茶) denotes the beverage that is derived from Camellia sinensis, the tea plant. Prior to the 8th century BCE, tea was known collectively under the term 荼 (pinyin: tú) along with a great number of other bitter plants. These two Chinese characters are identical, with the exception of an additional horizontal stroke in the Chinese lettering 荼, which translates to tea. The older character is made up of the radical 艸 (pinyin: cǎo) in its reduced form of 艹 and the character 余 (pinyin: yú), which gives the phonetic cue.

Tea Culture Spiritual Connotation 
The spirit of the tea ceremony is the core of the tea culture. The connotation of the spirit of tea ceremony is harmony, peace, happiness and truthfulness, of which happiness is the most important point. Tea has a health effect, and regular tea drinking can strengthen the body. Physical health is the prerequisite for "pleasure and nourishment", and only by enjoying oneself can one get the sublimation of the realm of life and improve the quality of life. In general, after familiarizing ourselves with the spirit of the tea ceremony, we can better inherit and promote the tea culture.

History 
Tea was identified in Southwest China over four thousand years ago. Most scholars credit Shen Nong, considered the father of medicine and agriculture, as the first person to discover the effects of tea. He was known to have tasted numerous leaves to determine if they could be used as food or medicine. According to legend, there are two different accounts telling how he discovered tea's beneficial attributes. First, it is said he had a transparent stomach where he could see how his stomach was reacting to what he ate. After a long day of picking leaves, he was tired, and when he was boiling water, some leaves fell in. It was sweet when he drank the water, and he enjoyed the taste. Soon after that, he became more energized. In the second accounting, Shen Nong tasted 72 poisonous leaves and became very sick, and was close to death. When some leaves fell beside him, he put them in his mouth and chewed them. Before long, he was feeling better and more energized, so he ate more leaves. Soon after, the poison left his body. The first book written about the medical effects of tea was the Shen Nong Herbal. It is believed the people of ancient China ate tea leaves throughout history. However, the development of tea as a cultural aspect of China was developed over time.

Zhou Dynasty (1046-256 BC) 

In the beginning, tea was a luxury item used mainly by nobles and royalty. The elite began to drink tea to energize the body and clear the mind instead of only for medical purposes. Teas were boiled with other plants to make a tea soup which was considered a combination of medicine, food, and drink. The consumption of the soup did not become popular among the masses due to its bitter taste. Records also indicate that ritual worship during the Zhou Dynasty included tea ceremonies led by officials. Tea was considered an exotic plant from southern China, so it was offered as tribute to the emperor and was served to the nobles.

Han Dynasty (206 BC-AD 220) 

Improved picking and processing of wild tea refined the taste of tea. It became a pleasant source of refreshment popular with the nobles.

Jin Dynasty (266-420) and Wei Period (220-265) 

As the tea culture developed, it is mainly concentrated in the upper class among literati, monks, the monarch, and his officials. Tea was set against wine as a beneficial drink, with wine being ‘violence and intoxication’ and tea ‘freshness and purity.' During this period, tea became the backdrop to deep philosophical discussions and a part of religious thought among Buddhists and Taoists. Buddhists believed it helped prevent dreariness, and Taoists believed it kept a person young and led to immortality. Before the Tang Dynasty, tea was used and consumed mainly by the upper classes for medicine, sacrifice, tribute, or ceremonial purposes, yet not enjoyed and appreciated by the masses.

Tang Dynasty (618-906) 

During the Tang Dynasty, tea culture or ‘the art of tea’ began to spread widely throughout China. A method of processing tea known as 'green stemming' was developed, making it more pleasant to drink, adding to its popularity. The Ancient Tea Horse Road development matured trade routes between Southern and Northwest China, and Tibet. The completion of the Grand Canal established a cost-effective method of transporting goods in China, making tea less expensive. Opening up trade routes and new processing techniques was vital to establishing tea as a national drink throughout China.

Artisans produced hundreds of examples of tea art, such as poems, drawings, songs, and literature. Tea houses and tea shops were also established during this time.

The Classic of Tea  (780) A significant contribution to the evolution of tea culture during the Tang Dynasty was an important work of literature by tea connoisseur Lu Yu, in which he analyzed every aspect of tea. The Classic of Tea was the first monograph regarding the study of tea, which consisted of ten chapters ranging from the history of tea, its cultivation, and how to prepare, serve, and drink it. Lu Yu also provided an overview of Chinese tea culture. He encouraged commoners to drink tea by including a section on what tea utensils could be omitted if one could not afford them. Lu Yu is known as the ‘Sage of Tea’ and the ‘God of Tea’ because of his profound influence on tea culture. His classic book tied drinking tea to spiritual matters, the arts, the Chinese way of life, morals, and philosophy. Though the majority of the Chinese population did not read it, intellectuals, nobility, and spiritual leaders embraced it. Confucian teachings indicated that the world should be managed, improved, and taught morals through classical learning. According to Liu, “Chinese intelligentsia regarded culture, or all literature and knowledge, as the carrier or instrument of human morality serving to carry out the civilizing function of the Tao (the way that the universe functions).” Lu Yu's classic writing helped transform an enjoyable beverage into an art woven into Chinese culture.

Song Dynasty (960-1279) 

The tea culture flourished during the Song Dynasty. Tea art, the tea ceremony, and tea houses continued to increase in popularity. “By the Song, a reputation for elegance required mastery of go (weiqi), zither, calligraphy, painting, shi and qu poetry, and tea.” These were considered the polite accomplishments of gentlemen. Some examples of tea literature, which was prolific at this time, are Record of Tea by Cai Xiang, and General Remarks on Tea, by Emperor Huizong, Zhao Ji.

China's monopoly on tea allowed them to use it as a powerful diplomatic tool. The Song established 'Tea and Horse Offices' ( 茶马司) to oversee the trading of tea for horses along the Tea Horse Road with Tibet and Northwest China. They required large numbers of warhorses to fight battles with invading northern nomadic Liao, Jin, and Xixia. When disputes arose, the dynastic government would threaten to cut off the tea trade and close of the 'Tea and Horse offices.'

The traditional tea culture with the elite and scholars became more complex, with the addition of numerous rules, tea culture continued to spread to the masses. Regional variations of tea culture formed throughout China. Tea cultivation moved from wild tea plants to established farming, leading to tea being traded worldwide. ‘Tribute tea’ was the gifting of high-quality tea to the emperor to honor him. It was developed into a large government bureaucracy that managed tea cultivation on rural farms and transported it to the dynastic government. The officials who oversaw the work often wrote poetry regarding their experiences and the intimate knowledge of the tea harvesting process. Picking began before dawn and stopped once the sun had risen. The poem by Southern Song tea expert Xiong Fan reads, “‘Throngs tussle, trampling new moss. I turn my head toward first blush over the dragon’s field. A warden beating a gong to urge haste, they carry baskets of tea down the mountain. When picking tea, one is not allowed to see the sunrise.’” The poem looks at the appreciation of tea as it acquired cultural significance throughout China. It also revealed how tea was harvested by studious pickers and focused on the official's personal experience, which was often described as a beautiful scene.

20th and 21st Centuries 
Tea was traded or produced worldwide. Under Chinese Communist Party chairman Mao Zedong's rule (1949-1976), China was mostly isolated from global markets. In the 1960s, under Mao's leadership, during the period known as the Great Leap Forward, tea production was significantly limited, and tea houses and shops were for the most part closed. The Cultural Revolution was also a period in which China’s tea culture suffered.

Under the leadership of Chinese leader Deng Xiaoping China has experienced double-digit economic growth, which has spurred a rebirth of the tea industry and the traditional aspect of tea culture. "A sense of self and nation has coalesced around tea." China is the leading producer of tea once again.

China currently offers various ways to experience cultural tea tourism, such as museums, tea trails, guided tours, tea houses, tea shops, tea markets, and tea tastings. There is one tea museum in mainland China and another in Taiwan. The National Tea Museum on the mainland can be found in Hangzhou in Zhijiana province, which maintains a variety of Chinese tea culture exhibits.

A revitalization of the traditional tea house throughout China has been spurred on by the introduction of new designer tea houses that cater to the young urban population.

Chinese tea ceremony 
The tea ceremony or 'Cha Dao' (茶道) is a typical Chinese activity involving the ceremonial preparation and presentation of tea. It has held great cultural significance in China for over a thousand years. The important role of ceremony in Chinese culture is exemplified by the claim of the authors of Tea and Tea drinking: China's outstanding contribution to the mankind that, “The word ‘ceremony’ (Li, 礼) is the basis or gene of Chinese culture and the first syllable of Chinese civilization, as it says ‘Of all things, courtesy comes first’ (万事礼为先).”

The tea ceremony grew in popularity in the Tang Dynasty reaching its peak in the Song Dynasty. The basic steps of a tea ceremony include: prepare tea, offer or serve tea, appreciate tea, sniff tea, savor and drink, and taste tea.

The concept of fine tea is required in both the formal tea ceremony and the tea competition. It begins with high-quality tea that “embodies the soul of the mountains and rivers, the essence of heaven and earth, and the loving care of man.” The second essential element is high-quality water. The highest quality water is ‘Tiashui,’ rain or snow water collected in bamboo tubes or crocks, with natural spring water coming in second. Lu Yu set 20 different levels of water quality. The next important part of fine tea is an esthetically pleasing tea service allowing for the fragrance of the tea to be appreciated. The Book of Tea described 24 different tea apparatus and methods of preparing the tea. Where the tea is taken is also a part of the fine tea experience. Tea is considered special if served on hills with mist or cool breezes and in the moonlight. “The Chinese emphasize the harmony between humans and nature in tea drinking.” During the Ming Dynasty, there were specific rules surrounding when, where, and what environment was appropriate for the drinking of tea. A person should be relaxed and not too busy when taking tea. He should be in a peaceful setting, such as a courtyard, bridge, the forest, or a pavilion with lotus in the background. The weather should also be nice, rainy, or in moderate sunshine. Tea should be taken in a peaceful, tranquil setting, not a tense, noisy one. Tea should be experienced with only a few people at a time. As Cai Xiang states in his book, A Record of Tea or Cha Lu in 1051, “The fewer guests when drinking tea, the better. A crowd of guests is noisy, and noise detracts from the elegance of the occasion. Drinking tea alone is serenity, with two guests is superior, with three or four is interesting, with five or six is extensive, and with seven or eight is an imposition.”

"It is believed that a tea-drinking process is a spiritual enjoyment, an art, a means of cultivating the moral character, and nourishing the mind." The tea ceremony is a tradition that exemplifies Chinese culture that has spread throughout the world, including in Japan, Korea, and Great Britain.

Tea competition 
Tea competitions began in the Tang dynasty but became popular during the Song. These competitions would represent high levels of tea-tasting where contestants, usually men in the imperial palace, presented their most refined tea. Emperor Song Huizeng was a tea competition enthusiast. The quality of tea, tools used, and the water condition were of great importance in winning a tea competition. This game was known as 'fighting tea' (doucha) or 'tea war' (mingzhan). The competition involved the entire process of tea preparation. An emphasis was placed on whipping the tea. The tea was stirred vigorously with a wooden whisk to create a foam on the surface called 'Tanghua.' The foam was made by pouring the boiling water over the tea leaves and whisking the water; this is known as dian (点) and fu (副). This process can be repeated up to seven times. If the tea is seen through the foam, the competitor would lose the competition. "Because they considered tea making an elegant pursuit, skill at whipping up bubbles became a sign of refinement, and the man with the best froth could enjoy the cries of admiration from his peers." Displaying one's manhood was important during this time, and tea fighting was one way for men to prove themselves. During the Tang and Song dynasties, showing elite manhood was tied to their refined values. It was associated with high cultural pursuits, so winning the tea competition allowed the winner to display their successful masculine image.

Tea arts 
During the Tang and Song Dynasties, literati produced poetry, calligraphy, and paintings to show their cultivated minds and express themselves. They became enthusiastic tea drinkers as they worked on their art. "Talented drinkers also raised the general tone of tea drinking by associating it with other refined pursuits such as art, music, and literature." Lu Yu, the author of The Classic of Tea, was also an accomplished poet and calligrapher. Following is an excerpt of a famous tea poem written in the 8th century CE when tea art and literature were just emerging.The first bowl sleekly moistened throat and lips;

The second banished all my loneliness;

The third expelled the dullness from my mind,

Sharpening inspiration gained from all the books I've read.

The fourth brought forth light perspiration,

Dispersing a lifetime's troubles through my pores.

The fifth bowl cleansed ev'ry atom of my being.

The sixth has made me kin to the Immortals.

The seventh is the utmost I can drinkThis poem was a thank you note from Yu espousing the virtues of tea after receiving it as a gift. Giving gifts of tea was a common practice at this time and usually was reciprocated with a note and high-quality tea given in return. Often artists would send a poem along with the gift of tea, and the recipient would send another poem with a return gift of tea. From the gifts the term 'benevolent tea'() was coined.

Writing poetry was extremely popular during the Tang and Song Dynasties and was considered a requirement to be among this group of scholarly men. According to Hinsch, "... readers today can still enjoy more than forty-eight thousand surviving poems written by two thousand poets from the Tang Dynasty alone. Song writers continued to use tea as a stock poetic theme, and some of the greatest literary figures of that era, such as Su Shi, wrote enthusiastically and repeatedly about tea."

Calligraphy is another art form that was very popular among the artisans of the Tang and Song, in which they integrated tea culture. Some of the calligraphy considered masterpieces of this era are centered around tea. For example, a casual note from Su Shi to a friend inviting him to tea housed at the National Palace Museum in Beijing, is considered an artistic treasure because of its beauty.

Tea drinking customs

Tea customs vary amongst different groups of people, regions, lifestyles, and religions. “Chinese tea arts include Confucianism tea, Taoism tea, Buddhism tea, and vulgar tea (俗茶) 'tea of the public,' which conform to the corresponding religious morals and behavior standards.” Drinking tea for the Taoists represents how the body and soul are regarded as one and improving oneself through self-cultivation; tea helps the Buddhist understand the meaning of Zen; while the Confucians believe tea and drinking tea are used for hospitality representing their humanistic views.

China's national minority cultures have their own tea customs. In the words of Li Xiousong, "The Tibetans put tea before food." A gift of brick tea is considered the most valuable gift. They give butter tea to the most distinguished guests, salt tea to regular guests, and plain tea to people of Han nationality.  Mongolian herdsmen drink milk tea. When a guest visits, they are invited in and presented with a cup of tea from the host, prepared by the hostess. Not accepting the tea would be considered extremely rude and offensive.

There are several special circumstances in which tea is prepared and consumed in Chinese culture, and is preserved completely in Mainland China and Taiwan.

A sign of hospitality 
Hospitality is important in Chinese culture, and offering tea to a guest is considered customary practice. A guest is expected to accept the tea and take at least a sip as a sign of appreciation.

A sign of respect 
According to Chinese tradition, members of the younger generation should show their respect to members of the older generation by offering a cup of tea. Inviting their elders to restaurants for tea is a traditional holiday activity. Newly married couples serve tea to their elder family members. In the past, people of a lower social class served tea to the upper class in society. Today, with the increasing liberalization of Chinese society, this rule and its connotations have become blurred.

To apologize 
In Chinese culture, tea may be offered as part of a formal apology. For example, children who have misbehaved may serve tea to their parents as a sign of regret and submission.

To show gratitude and celebrate weddings 
In the traditional Chinese marriage ceremony, the bride and groom kneel in front of their respective parents, as well as elderly relatives such as grand parents and serve them tea and then thank them, together which represents an expression of their gratitude and respect. According to the tradition, the bride and groom serve both families.  This process symbolizes the joining of the two families.

Tea Drinking Style 
China is a big tea country, which pushes the way of drinking tea to the extreme. Drinking tea is a kind of enjoyment, focusing on the process. People in ancient times researched different ways of drinking tea to taste the taste of tea all over.

Tang Dynasty boiling tea method 
The tea was cooked directly in the kettle. This was the most common tea method in China's Tang Dynasty. Before boiling the tea, crush the tea leaves, boil the water, and put in the seasoning, then sprinkle the tea powder into the pot. When drinking, the tea dregs and tea soup together while hot, called "eat tea." Tang people cooking tea once like to add seasoning to the tea soup, such as salt, onion, ginger or orange peel, and so on.

Song Dynasty point tea method 
This method of drinking tea was used in the Song Dynasty, and tea people ate from this method. Song Dynasty tea drinking method rose to the height of aesthetics and reached the ultimate. They decorated the tea cake with many dragon and phoenix patterns, very delicate, called "dragon and phoenix group tea." When drinking tea, first, the cake tea is crushed into a fine powder, with boiling water, to brew some tea. To make the tea powder and water into one, with a tea brush quickly hit, the tea and water fully mingle and make a lot of white tea froth. This is where the Japanese matcha ceremony originated.

Ming Dynasty Tea Brewing Method 
By the Ming Dynasty, the tea-making and drinking method was simplified again and again. Zhu Yuanzhang vigorously promoted loose tea, which led to tea alienation, before only green tea, and then slowly appeared other tea types. The tea brewing method continues today, brewing tea without any seasoning, drinking the original taste of tea, the authentic flavor, while the tea tools and techniques used to brew tea also simplified a lot, more conducive to the spread of tea culture.

Finger tapping 
Light finger tapping is an informal way to thank the tea master or tea server for tea. While or after one's cup is filled, the receiver of the tea may tap the index and middle fingers (one or more in combination) to express gratitude to the person who served the tea. This custom is common in southern China, where meals are often accompanied by many servings of tea.

This custom is said to have originated in the Qing dynasty when the Qianlong Emperor traveled in disguise throughout the empire and his accompanying servants were instructed not to reveal their master's identity. One day in a restaurant in southern China, the emperor poured tea for a servant. To that servant it was a huge honor to have the emperor pour him a cup of tea. Out of habit, he wanted to kneel and bow to  express his thanks to the emperor, however he could not do this since that would reveal the emperor's identity. Instead, he tapped the table with bent fingers to represent kneeling to the Emperor and to express his gratitude and respect. In this sense, the bent fingers supposedly signify a bowing servant.

In formal tea ceremonies nodding the head or saying "thank you" is more appropriate.

Brewing Chinese tea

The different ways of brewing Chinese tea depend on variables like the formality of the occasion, the means of the people preparing it, and the kind of tea being brewed. For example, green teas are more delicate than oolong teas or black teas; therefore, green tea should be brewed with cooler water. The most informal method of brewing tea is to simply add the leaves to a pot containing hot water. This method is commonly found in households and restaurants, for example, in the context of dim sum or yum cha in Cantonese restaurants. Another method for serving tea is to use a small lidded bowl called a gaiwan. The Hongwu Emperor of the Ming dynasty contributed to the development of loose tea brewing by banning the production of compressed tea.

Gongfu cha (Kung fu tea)

Gongfu cha, meaning "making tea with skill", is a popular method of tea ceremony in China. It makes use of small Yixing teapots holding about 100–150 ml (4 or 5 fl.oz.), the size being thought to enhance the aesthetics and to "round out" the taste of the tea being brewed.  Small tea cups are being used along with Yixing teapots. Gongfu tea is best consumed after meal to help digestion. Brewing tea in a Yixing teapot can be done for private enjoyment as well as to welcome guests. Depending on the region of China, there may be differences in the steps of brewing as well as the tools used in the process. For example, Taiwanese-style gongfu cha makes use of several additional instruments including tweezers and a tea strainer. The procedure is mostly applicable to oolong teas, but it is some used to make pu'er and other fermented teas.

Influence on Chinese culture
Roughly since the Tang Dynasty, drinking tea has been an essential part of self-cultivation. Chinese Chan (similar to Japanese Zen) philosophy is also linked with drinking tea.

Teaware
Different teawares can affect people's expectations of tea. First of all, different teaware will affect how people feel about drinking tea. When tea is drunk with a tea set that looks ornamental, people's mood will become pleasant; when the teaware is not so ornamental, people's pleasure in drinking tea will be reduced. Secondly, the visual effect of the teaware affects people's expectations of the bitterness of the tea. The better the teaware, the more bitter people will think the tea is, and the more bitter the tea is, the better the tea is. So the teaware also influences people's judgment of the value of tea when no price information was provided. The practice of drinking tea was considered to be an expression of personal morality, education, social principles, and status. The price of tea ware varies depending on the material and quality of it. A set of jade tea ware can cost hundreds of thousands dollars whereas a set of low quality tea ware may only cost less than a hundred dollars. Increased enthusiasm for tea drinking led to the greater production of teaware.

Teahouse
Ancient Chinese scholars used the teahouse as a place for sharing ideas. The teahouse was where political allegiances and social rank were said to have been temporarily suspended in favor of honest and rational discourse. It is a paradise for tea lovers, but also a place for people to rest, recreation and socialization. Likewise, the teahouse is a microcosm or window of society, Chinese teahouse has a long history, as early as the Tang Emperor Xuanzong period, only then not called the teahouse called "tea store". The leisurely consumption of tea promoted conviviality and civility among the participants. The teahouse is not only a minor by-product of Chinese tea culture; it offers historical evidence of Chinese tea history. Today, people can also sense a humanistic atmosphere in Beijing's Lao She Teahouse and other East China cities like Hangzhou, Suzhou, Yangzhou, Nanjing, Wuxi, Shaoxing, Shanghai, and other places. The teahouse atmosphere is still dynamic and vigorous.

Modern culture
In modern China, virtually every dwelling has a set of tea implements for brewing a cup of hot tea. They are symbols of welcome for visitors or neighbors. Traditionally, a visitor to a Chinese home is expected to sit down and drink tea while talking; visiting while remaining standing is considered uncouth. Folding the napkin in tea ceremonies is a traditional act in China performed to keep away bad qi energy. In Taiwan, tea ceremonies are held not only in daily life but also on important occasions.

Tea was regarded as one of the seven daily necessities, the others being firewood, rice, oil, salt, soy sauce, and vinegar. There are many different  types of tea such as: green tea, oolong tea, red tea, black tea, white tea, yellow tea, puerh tea and flower tea. Traditionally, fresh tea leaves are regularly turned over in a deep bowl. This process allows the leaves dry in a way that preserves their full flavor, ready for use.

See also

 History of Tea in China
 Chinese Tea
 China National Tea Museum
 Chinese social relations
 Chinese tea ceremony schools
 Gongfu tea ceremony
 Tea classics
 Tea pet
 Tea-picking opera
 Teaism
 The Classic of Tea
 Yum cha
 East Asian tea ceremony

References

External links

Basic Facts of Tea

 
Chinese traditions